Léon Vandeputte (20 August 1901 – 7 April 1981) was a French weightlifter. He competed in the men's middleweight event at the 1924 Summer Olympics.

References

External links
 

1901 births
1981 deaths
French male weightlifters
Olympic weightlifters of France
Weightlifters at the 1924 Summer Olympics
Sportspeople from Roubaix
20th-century French people